The 1988 Long Beach State 49ers football team represented California State University, Long Beach during the 1988 NCAA Division I-A football season.

Cal State Long Beach competed in the Big West Conference. The team was led by second-year head coach Larry Reisbig, and played home games at Veterans Stadium on the campus of Long Beach City College in Long Beach, California. They finished the season with a record of three wins and nine losses (3–9, 3–4 Big West). The 49ers offense scored 201 points while the defense allowed 385 points.

Schedule

Team players in the NFL
The following were selected in the 1989 NFL Draft.

Notes

References

Long Beach State
Long Beach State 49ers football seasons
Long Beach State 49ers football